Choriza May (born Adrian Martìn) is a Spanish-British drag performer, graphic designer, and illustrator most known for competing on series 3 of RuPaul's Drag Race UK.

Career
In 2019, Choriza May performed on Northern Pride's main stage. She competed on series 3 of RuPaul's Drag Race UK. Following the cast announcement, some Drag Race fans questioned why she did not compete on Drag Race España, instead. On season 3, Choriza made it to the Snatch Game and was part of a double elimination alongside River Medway. May placed 6th/7th overall. She was later a guest judge on the second season of Drag Race España.

Personal life
Choriza May is originally from Valencia, Spain and lives in Newcastle, United Kingdom. She has British citizenship.

Filmography

Television
 RuPaul's Drag Race UK (series 3, 2021)
 Drag Race España (season 2, 2022)

Awards and nominations

References

External links

 

Living people
British drag queens
British graphic designers
British illustrators
Gay entertainers
People from Valencia
Choriza May
Spanish drag queens
Spanish emigrants to the United Kingdom
Spanish graphic designers
Spanish illustrators
Year of birth missing (living people)
20th-century LGBT people
21st-century LGBT people